Hugh Trenchard, 1st Viscount Trenchard received numerous titles, decorations, and honours both during and after his military career.

Ranks
Trenchard held the following ranks:

31 March 1891, 2nd Lieutenant, Forfar and Kincardine Artillery (Militia)
9 September 1893, 2nd Lieutenant, Royal Scots Fusiliers
12 August 1896, Lieutenant, Royal Scots Fusiliers
28 February 1900, Captain, Royal Scots Fusiliers
22 August 1902, Brevet Major
1 June 1908, Temporary Lieutenant Colonel
4 November 1910, Brevet Major
7 August 1914, Temporary Lieutenant Colonel
18 January 1915, Brevet Lieutenant Colonel
3 June 1915, Brevet Colonel
25 August 1915, Temporary Brigadier General
24 March 1916, Temporary Major-General
1 January 1917, Major-General
3 January 1918, Major-General, Royal Air Force
1 August 1919, Air Vice-Marshal, Royal Air Force
11 August 1919, Air Marshal, Royal Air Force
1 April 1922, Air Chief Marshal, Royal Air Force
1 January 1927, Marshal of the Royal Air Force

Mentions in Despatches
25 August 1905 (by F D Lugard, High Commissioner of the Northern Nigeria Protectorate)
18 September 1906 (by Lieutenant-Colonel H C Moorhouse, Officer Commanding Southern Nigeria Regiment)
31 May 1915 (by Field Marshal Sir John French, Commander-in-Chief British Armies in the Field)
1 November 1915 (by Field Marshal Sir John French, Commander-in-Chief, The British Army in France)
1 January 1916 (by Field Marshal Sir John French, Commander-in-Chief, The British Army in France)
15 June 1916
4 January 1917
11 December 1917
20 May 1918
10 April 1919

Orders of chivalry and decorations
18 September 1906, Distinguished Service Order
1 January 1914, Companion in the Most Honourable Order of the Bath
1 January 1918, Knight Commander of the Most Honourable Order of the Bath
1 January 1924, Knight Grand Cross of the Most Honourable Order of the Bath
20 July 1935, Knight Grand Cross of the Royal Victorian Order
1 January 1951, Order of Merit

Titles of nobility

30 December 1919, Baronet
27 January 1930, Baron Trenchard, of Wolfeton in the County of Dorset
4 February 1936, Viscount Trenchard, of Wolfeton in the County of Dorset

Medals
Distinguished Service Order
Queen's South Africa Medal with Transvaal, Orange Free State and Cape Colony clasps
King's South Africa Medal with South Africa 1901 and South Africa 1902 clasps
Africa General Service Medal with North Nigeria 1904, Southern Nigeria 1904-05 and Southern Nigeria 1905-06 clasps
1914 Star with 5 August - 22 November 1914 clasp
War Medal
Victory Medal with MiD oakleaf
King George V Silver Jubilee Medal
King George VI Coronation Medal
Queen Elizabeth II Coronation Medal
Croix de Guerre (Belgium)
Distinguished Service Medal (U.S. Army)

Styles

Honorary degrees
1926, Doctor of Civil Law, University of Oxford
date unknown Doctor of Laws, University of Cambridge

Foreign awards
 25 August 1915, Order of St. Anne, 3rd Class with Swords, Russia
 1910s, Croix de Guerre (France)
 9 November 1916, Légion d'honneur, Croix de Commandeur, France
 24 September 1917, Order of Leopold, Commander, Belgium
 11 March 1918, Croix de guerre, Belgium
 8 November 1918, Order of the Crown of Italy, Commander, Kingdom of Italy
 1910s, Order of Saint Stanislaus, 1st Class with Swords, Russia
 15 July 1919, Distinguished Service Medal, United States
 4 January 1921, Order of the Sacred Treasure, 1st Class, Japan
 date unknown, Order of the Two Rivers, Iraq

Honorary appointments
13 July 1919 Colonel of the Royal Scots Fusiliers (with the honorary rank of Major-General). Resigned appointment on 1 May 1946.

References

Trenchard
Hugh Trenchard, 1st Viscount Trenchard